Flora and María were the first two of nine female Christian Martyrs of Córdoba. After denouncing Islam before an Islamic judge, they were imprisoned. Though threatened "with being thrown upon the streets as prostitutes", they were eventually beheaded.  They are commemorated on 24 November.

Flora
Flora was born to a Christian mother and a Muslim father.  Her father died when she was still very young, and Flora was brought up as a Christian. Her Muslim older brother tried in vain to convert Flora to Islam, eventually surrendering his sister to the authorities.  Flora was imprisoned and a Muslim scholar was appointed to teach her about Islam, but she managed to escape and fled towards the Christian settlements.

María
María was born to a Christian father and Muslim mother. Her mother was baptised some time after she got married. Fearing charges of apostasy, the couple and their two children left their home in the town of Elche and moved to the village of Fronianus. María lost her mother at a young age, and her father sent her to convent in Cuteclara. The convent's abbess, Artemia, told María how she witnessed the execution of her two sons by the Muslim rulers thirty years prior. The story had a long-lasting impression on the girl.

María's older brother, Walabonsus, also received a religious education at the monastery of Saint Felix. The siblings, who were separated when María was sent to the convent and Walabonsus to the monastery, met again when Walabonsus was appointed one of the supervisors of María's convent. Walabonsus was executed by Muslim authorities on 16 July 851, and his martyrdom along with Artemia's story drove María to follow in her brother's footsteps.

Imprisonment and martyrdom
Flora and María met at the church of Saint Acisclus. and decided to denounce Islam together. They did so before a Qadi (Islamic judge) and were subsequently imprisoned.

In jail, Flora was offered a full pardon if she "returned" to Islam, but she explained that the only beliefs she had ever held were Christian. This explanation was not accepted because according to Islamic law, a child born to even one Muslim parent should have adopted Islam as their religion. Sabigotho used to visit Flora and María in jail and once spent a night in their cell "as if she herself were shackled, not only to console the two soldiers, but to confide in them her own intention to die".

In accordance with Shari'a law, Flora and María were found guilty of two different crimes: Flora was executed for apostasy, and María for blasphemy.  Before the executions, the young women were threatened "with being thrown upon the streets as prostitutes", which was an unbearable punishment for virgins.  They were beheaded on 24 November 851.

There bodies were left in the open for a day then thrown into the river.  The body of Mary was recovered and taken to the convent, that of Flora was never recovered.  Their heads were buried at the church of St Acisilus in Cordoba.

Legacy
Flora and María were the first two of nine female Martyrs of Córdoba described by Eulogius of Córdoba in his Memorial of the Saints. Their example inspired other Christians to become martyrs.

References

Groups of Christian martyrs of the Middle Ages
Spanish Roman Catholic saints
9th-century people from al-Andalus
People from Córdoba, Spain
 Cordoba
Christian saints killed by Muslims
Christians executed for refusing to convert to Islam
Christians from al-Andalus